Kazi Golam Morshed is a Bangladesh Nationalist Party politician and the former Member of Parliament of Natore-3.

Career
Morshed was elected to parliament from Natore-3 as a Bangladesh Nationalist Party candidate in 1995, 1996, and 2001. He was arrested by Bangladesh Police in 2015. He is the Vice-President of Natore District unit of Bangladesh Nationalist Party.

References

Living people
People from Natore District
Bangladesh Nationalist Party politicians
5th Jatiya Sangsad members
7th Jatiya Sangsad members
8th Jatiya Sangsad members
Year of birth missing (living people)